New Day Dawning, an album by Cherish the Ladies, was released in 1996 on the Green Linnet label.

Track listing
 "Highway to Kilkenny/The Boys of Portaferry/The Abbey Reel/Ashmaleen House" – 3:38
 "Green Grow the Rushes, O" – 4:48
 "Peter Murphy's/The Ballinakill Ditch/Barrel Rafferty's Jig" – 4:04
 "A Neansaí Mhíle Gra" – 5:30
 "Crowley's Reels/Tom Ward's Downfall" – 3:17
 "Green Cottage Polka/Jer O'Connell's/Tom's Tavern" – 3:06
 "Lord Mayo" – 3:08
 "The Galway Rover" – 3:51
 "New Broom/Joe Ryan's Barn Dance/St. Ruth's Bush/The Penny Candle" – 5:35
 "Ned of the Hill" – 4:24
 "Broken Wings" – 5:16
 "Rayleen's Reel/The Pullet/Scotch Mary/Within a Mile of Dublin" – 5:15
 "Keg of Brandy" – 2:57

References

External links
 Complete identification of album contents at irishtune.info

Cherish the Ladies albums
1996 albums